Gears Pop! was a mobile real-time strategy video game in which two players battle using Funko Pop!-stylized characters from the Gears fictional universe. Its gameplay was modeled on that of Clash Royale. The game released in August 2019 on Android, iOS, and Windows platforms, about a month in advance of the next major entry in the series, Gears 5. The game was developed by UK-based developer Mediatonic along with The Coalition.

Gameplay 

In Gears Pop, two players battle by playing tokens on a playfield, which spawned Funko Pop-stylized characters from the Gears of War fictional universe. The characters used cover points to advance on the enemy's two defense turrets and home base before the opponent accomplishes the same. Apart from its cover mechanics, its gameplay heavily resembled that of Clash Royale.

The game was free-to-play and used microtransactions. It was one of the few mobile games to feature Xbox achievement compatibility.

Development 

The game was announced at E3 2018 and was released on August 22, 2019, on Android, iOS, and Windows platforms, about a month prior to the next major release in the series, Gears 5.

The servers for the game were shut down in April 2021.

Reception 

Gears Pop received "mixed or average" reviews, according to review aggregator Metacritic.

Pocket Gamer gave the game three stars out of five, writing, "Gears POP! is a decent mobile strategy game, one which can keep your attention for hours thanks to online play, but it's not the best in its genre either."

Within a week of launch, Gears Pop had over one million users.

References

External links 
 

2019 video games
Products and services discontinued in 2021
Android (operating system) games
IOS games
Windows games
Gears of War
Real-time strategy video games
Multiplayer video games
Sentient toys in fiction
Video games about toys
Video game spin-offs
Video games developed in the United Kingdom
Video games set on fictional planets
Delisted digital-only games
Inactive multiplayer online games